Reserve service may refer to the following:

 A military reserve force
 The National Grid Reserve Service in the United Kingdom